Palatine is a village in County Carlow, Ireland. It lies mostly within the townlands of Knockarda and Killyshane, close to the County Kildare border. Its unusual English name bears no relation to its original Irish name, Na Cnoic Arda, which roughly translates as 'high hills'.

"Palatinetown" is mentioned in A Topographical Dictionary of Ireland by Samuel Lewis, 1837:

See also
 Palatine GAA

References

Towns and villages in County Carlow